Viola School District is a school district in Fulton County, Arkansas.

References

External links
 

School districts in Arkansas
Education in Fulton County, Arkansas